Heroes of Might and Magic V: Hammers of Fate is the first expansion pack to the turn-based strategy game Heroes of Might and Magic V. Like the original game, it was developed by Nival Interactive, under the guidance of Ubisoft.

Reception

The game received "average" reviews according to the review aggregation website Metacritic.

References

External links
Forum

2006 video games
Heroes of Might and Magic
Multiplayer and single-player video games
Ubisoft games
Video game expansion packs
Video games developed in Russia
Windows games
Windows-only games